Middleshaw may refer to the following places in the United Kingdom:

 Middleshaw, Cumbria, England
 Middleshaw, Dumfries and Galloway, Scotland